Rex Jay Harvey  (born 1946 in Dexter, Iowa - December 22, 2019 in Prescott, Arizona) was an American decathlete.  He has designed and holds patents of several nozzles for aircraft engines. Also, he helped design several nuclear reactor power plants.

Harvey is a native of Redfield, Iowa and formerly resided in Mentor, Ohio.

High school career
Harvey helped his Dexfield high school track and field team win two back to back state team championships in 1963 and 1964 under the legendary coach Dean Roe. While in high school, Rex won many state titles as a pole vaulter and a member of several relay teams.

College career
Harvey received a bachelor of science degree in mechanical engineering from Iowa State where he was a scholarship athlete in track and field. He received four invitations to U.S. NCAA Division I Championships for track and field. He later earned a master of science degree in systems management from the University of Southern California.

United States Air Force service
Following college, Harvey served his country in the United States Air Force becoming a Vietnam War veteran and attaining the rank of Captain. During his service, he represented the United States in track and field as a member of the Military track and field team during numerous international competitions.

Professional career
He represented the USA in six international track and field teams competing in Italy, Brazil, Sweden and the Middle East, and in decathlon team competition with the Soviet Union and Canada. In 1972 and 1976, he was an Olympic Trials finalist in the decathlon, finishing 13th in 1976.

Drake Relays
Rex Harvey competed and officiated at the Drake Relays for many years. December 2020 Drake Relays announced the creation of the Drake Relays Rex Harvey Endowment for his service to Drake Relays.

Masters career
Harvey won straight 13 straight national decathlon championships. He also has several pentathlon championships as well as other national championships in the pole vault, relays, etc.

He has won several World Association of Veteran Athletes (WAVA) world championships including the decathlon in 1989 and 1991, where he set a WAVA world record in M45 that still stands.  He won the World Masters Athletics Championships pole vault in Japan in 1993 and was a member of the world championship 4X100 and 4X400 relays in 1991.

On June 20, 1982, he scored 7280 points to set what was then the American record for the Men's Decathlon for the M30-39 age group.  On July 18, 1991, he scored 7780 points to set what was then the World record for the Men's Decathlon for the M40-49 age group.

He was USATF outstanding male masters combined-events athlete of the year in 1989, 1991, and 1996. In 2000, Rex Harvey was inducted into the USATF Masters Hall of Fame.

He was inducted into the USATF Masters Hall of Fame in 2000.

Age-Graded Tables
Beginning in 1989, he collaborated with Alan  L. Jones and several others to develop tables for grading athletic performances based on sex and age.   The 1989 booklet Masters Age-Graded Tables  by the National Masters News and the World Association of Veteran Athletes (WAVA) was later followed by the 1994 booklet Age-Graded Tables by National Masters News, P.O. Box 2372, Van Nuys, CA 91404.  More recently, in 2004 Rex collaborated with Alan L. Jones and others to release an improved set of age-graded tables.  The most recent version of the tables were published in 2010, still crediting Rex Harvey.  These tables have been used extensively by both WAVA, which later became the World Masters Athletics (WMA), and USA Track & Field (USATF).

Public Official
Rex Harvey was appointed to the WAVA (WMA) information technology (IT) as a coordinator and was elected as Vice President (Stadia) of WAVA (WMA) for two terms.

In 2007 at Osaka, Japan, during the 46th Congress of the International Association of Athletics Federations (IAAF), he was elected to the Master's Committee of the IAAF as a representative from the United States.

At the time of his death, he was the President of USATF Masters Track & Field.

Accomplishes USATF Masters Chair, USATF Masters Games Committee, 2007 USATF President's Award, and David Pain Award (2009, 1993 and 1992).

Personal life
On July 6, 1946, Rex Jay Harvey was born to Leo Marvel Harvey, and Anna Alice (née Rote) Harvey in Dexter, Iowa. He married his wife Joan in 1969 and they remained married for fifty years until his death. They had two children Jared and Keelie.

Harvey was a Research Development Engineer at Parker Corporation in Cleveland, Ohio.

His grave is in East Linn Cemetery near Redfield, Iowa.

See also
 Masters (athletics)
 Masters athletics (track and field)
 Masters athletics (track and field)#Age-graded tables
 USA Track & Field
 Senior Olympics

References

External links
 IAAF International Association of Athletics Federations - Official site
 USA Track & Field masters - Official site
 World Masters Athletics - Official site
 The Masters Track & Field - Home Page
  Masters History. The Rex Harvey Collection
 Masters Track and Field World Rankings - mastersathletics.net
 National Masters News
 WAVA / WMA age grading calculator - 1994 tables
 WMA age grading calculator - 2006 tables
 Age Grading calculator - lollylegs.com

1946 births
Living people
American male decathletes
People from Dallas County, Iowa
American masters athletes
American referees and umpires
Athletics (track and field) administrators